William Diller Matthew FRS (February 19, 1871 – September 24, 1930) was a vertebrate paleontologist who worked primarily on mammal fossils, although he also published a few early papers on mineralogy, petrological geology, one on botany, one on trilobites, and he described Tetraceratops insignis, which was much later suggested to be the oldest known (Early Permian) therapsid.

Matthew was born in Saint John, New Brunswick, the son of George Frederic Matthew and Katherine (Diller) Matthew. His father was an amateur geologist and paleontologist who instilled his son with an abiding interest in the earth sciences. Matthew received an A.B. at the University of New Brunswick in 1889 and then earned his Ph.D. at Columbia University in 1894.

Matthew was curator of the American Museum of Natural History from the mid-1890s to 1927, and director of the University of California Museum of Paleontology from 1927 to 1930. He was the father of Margaret Matthew, a noted artist, illustrator, and sculptor who specialized in visualizing extinct species.

Asia hypothesis

Matthew believed that the first humans had originated in Asia, he visited Asia by taking part in the Central Asiatic expeditions. Matthew was also well known for his deeply influential 1915 article "Climate and evolution", Matthews theory was that climate change was how organisms came to live where we find them today in opposition to the theory of continental drift. His basic premise was that cyclical changes in global climate along with the prevailing tendency for mammals to disperse from north to south account for the odd geographic patterns of living mammals, he believed that humans and many other groups of modern mammals first evolved in the northern areas of the globe, especially central Asia because of the shifting climatic circumstances, Matthew firmly placed hominid origins in central Asia as he thought that the high plateau of Tibet was the forcing ground of mammalian evolution.

Selected works

References

External links
 
 
 

1871 births
1930 deaths
Canadian paleontologists
People associated with the American Museum of Natural History
Canadian Fellows of the Royal Society
University of New Brunswick alumni
Columbia University alumni
Paleontology in New Brunswick